Max Moser (born 24 September 1949) is an Austrian ice hockey player. He competed in the men's tournament at the 1976 Winter Olympics.

References

1949 births
Living people
Austrian ice hockey players
Olympic ice hockey players of Austria
Ice hockey players at the 1976 Winter Olympics
Sportspeople from Klagenfurt